The Philippine House Committee on Health, or House Health Committee is a standing committee of the Philippine House of Representatives.

Jurisdiction 
As prescribed by House Rules, the committee's jurisdiction includes the following:
 Public health and hygiene
 Quarantine, medical, hospital and other health facilities and services

Members, 18th Congress

Historical members

18th Congress

Chairperson 
 Angelina Tan (Quezon–4th, NPC) July 22, 2019 – October 6, 2020
 Ma. Lucille Nava (Guimas–Lone, PDP–Laban) October 6, 2020 – October 13, 2020

Members for the Majority 
 Marissa Andaya (Camarines Sur–1st, NPC)
 Francisco Datol Jr. (SENIOR CITIZENS)
 Bernardita Ramos (Sorsogon–2nd, NPC)

See also
 House of Representatives of the Philippines
 List of Philippine House of Representatives committees
 Department of Health

Notes

References

External links 
House of Representatives of the Philippines

Health
Parliamentary committees on Healthcare